Lawrence Irvin Conrad (born 1949) is a British historian and scholar of Oriental studies, specializing in Near Eastern studies and the history of medicine. He currently serves as historian for the Wellcome Institute for the History of Medicine in London.

Education and career
Conrad received his Ph.D. from Princeton University, completing his dissertation on The Plague in the Early Medieval Near East in 1981. After a brief period working at the American University of Beirut, he moved in 1985 to the Wellcome Institute for the History of Medicine  at University College, London.  In 2001, he moved to the University of Hamburg, where he remained until his retirement in 2008. Conrad is known for his work on medieval Near Eastern social history, Arabic and Islamic medicine, and Arabic, Greek, and Syriac historiography.

Selected publications
Authored books

Edited books

Translated books

References

1949 births
Academics of University College London
British Arabists
British literary historians
British medical historians
British Islamic studies scholars
British male non-fiction writers
British orientalists
Living people
British scholars of Islam
History of Quran scholars
Princeton University alumni
Academic staff of the University of Hamburg